The Sindhi cap, also known as the Sindhī ṭopī rarely known as the Sindhi Kufi, is a skullcap worn predominantly by Sindhis in Sindh, Pakistan. Together with Ajrak, the Sindhi cap is regarded as an essential part of Sindhi, Saraiki and Balochi culture.

History 

The Sindhi cap originated during the time of the Kalhoras, but came into general use under the Talpurs. It was widely worn in Sindh by all except religious persons, who wore the turban. It was primarily associated with the higher classes, both Sindhi Muslims and Sindhi Hindus, specially the Amil caste.

In Sindhi culture, the Sindhi cap is often given as a gift or as a sign of respect, along with the traditional Ajrak. Hand-woven Sindhi caps are a product of hard labour, and are primarily produced in Tharparkar, Umerkot, Sanghar and other districts of the Mirpurkhas division of Sindh.

The Sindhi cap, along with Ajrak, is specially celebrated on Sindhi Cultural Day, which was originally named Sindhi Topi Day. In December 2009, for the first time Sindhi Topi Day was celebrated in Pakistan’s Sindh province to celebrate the Sindhi cap, and Sindhi culture in general, where the following year the day was renamed to Sindhi Cultural Day.

Description 
The hat is a cylindrical skullcap with an arch shaped cut-out on the frontal side. Often worn with the Ajrak, the hat is embroidered with intricate geometrical designs with small pieces of mirrors or gemstones sewed into it.

See also 
 Culture of Sindh
 Sindhi Cultural Day
 Ajrak

References

External links 

Pakistani headgear
Pakistani clothing
Indian headgear
Indian clothing
Sindhi culture
Caps